Kudryavtsev or Kudriavtsev (masculine) or Kudryavtseva (feminine) is a common surname and was a noble family in Russia. It is the last name of the following people:

Male
Alexander Kudryavtsev, a world champion Greco-Roman wrestler in the 1980s
Alexander Kudryavtsev (b. 1985), professional tennis player
Anatoliy Kudryavtsev (b. 1946), Russian type designer, Prof., Doctor of Arts 
Konstantin Borisovich Kudryavtsev (b. 1980), Russian FSB agent allegedly involved in the poisoning of Alexei Navalny, missing since 2020
Lev Kudryavtsev, mathematician
Nikolai Kudryavtsev, petroleum geologist
Nikolay Kudryavtsev, rector of the Moscow Institute of Physics and Technology
Nikolay Kudryavtsev (singer), singer for the band Zemlyane
Viktor Kudriavtsev, figure skating coach and choreographer
Viktor Kudryavtsev (guitarist), guitarist for the band Zemlyane
Mikhail Konstantinovich Kudryavtsev, ethnographer, ethnologist, and indologist from the USSR

Female
Alla Kudryavtseva, professional tennis player (daughter of Alexander Kudryavtsev)
Yana Kudryavtseva, rhythmic gymnast

Russian-language surnames